Florence Emily Carlyle (September24, 1864 May2, 1923) was a Canadian figure and portrait painter, known especially for her handling of light and fabric. Her work is included in the collection of the National Gallery of Canada.

Childhood
Florence Carlyle was born September 24, 1864, in Galt, Ontario, to Emily Youmans Carlyle and William Carlyle. The second eldest of seven children, Florence was known throughout her life as "Bird" by family and friends. In 1871 the Carlyle family moved to Woodstock, Ontario, where her father, William Carlyle, worked as the county inspector of schools for Oxford County. While living in Woodstock, Emily created an art studio for local children who were interested in developing their artistic skills under the guidance of hired artists. Sensing her daughter's artistic talent, Emily arranged for Florence to have private drawing and painting lessons with William Lees Judson. William's uncle (and Florence's great-uncle) was the Scottish historian and philosopher Thomas Carlyle; and William was said by a contemporary writer to have inherited "much of the cleverness and the abstraction" of his celebrated forebear.

Early adulthood
In 1883 Florence and her younger sister, Lilian, exhibited several of their works at the Ladies' Department of the Toronto Industrial Exhibition. It was this exhibition that gave Florence widespread recognition as Princess Louise and her husband, the Marquis of Lorne purchased one of her paintings of white lilies on china. This event was heavily covered by The Globe, Daily Mail, and Woodstock's paper at the time.

Education while in Paris

After realizing that she needed to go abroad to further develop her artistic skill, 26-year-old Carlyle moved to Paris, France November 3, 1890. Carlyle journeyed to Paris with her artistic mentor, Paul Peel, his sister Margaret Peel, and their father John Peel. However, once in Paris she rented a flat on her own. Upon first arriving in Paris, Carlyle found it difficult to find an artistic academy that admitted women and furthermore, did not segregate men and women in classes. At first Carlyle attended the Académie Julian, but after a disagreement with Adolphe-William Bouguereau, she switched to the less prestigious Académie Delécluse. By 1892 Carlyle would return to Académie Julian to finish her studies. In 1893 she exhibited her painting Une Dame Hollandaise  at the Salon of the Société des Artistes Français, where it "received favourable attention. Carlyle returned to Woodstock, where her family still resided in 1896.

Later years
She had studios in London and Woodstock, and in 1897 became the first woman to be elected an Associate of the Royal Canadian Academy. In 1899, she established a studio in New York City. In 1904, her oil painting The Tiff was selected to appear in the Canadian exhibition at the Louisiana Purchase Exposition, where it won a silver medal. The Montreal Gazette described this painting (now in the permanent collection of the Art Gallery of Ontario) as "a strong piece of work depicting a lover's quarrel", and praised its execution as "clear cut and decisive."

The last twenty years of her life were spent in Crowborough, Sussex, England, where she and her partner, Juliet Hastings, bought an English cottage they called "Sweet Haws".

Carlyle died at Crowborough in the spring of 1923. Most of her work is in the collection of the Woodstock Art Gallery in Woodstock, Ontario (55 works).

Record sale prices 
At the Cowley Abbott Auction, Important Canadian Art (Sale 2), December 1, 2022, lot #112, The Studio (purchased by the Art Gallery of Ontario), oil on canvas, 35.25 x 21.5 ins (89.5 x 54.6 cms), Auction Estimate: $25,000.00 - $30,000.00, realized a price of $102,000.00.

Publications
Florence Caryle, "Student Life in Paris". Sentinel-Review (Woodstock), 10 February 1936.

References

Further reading

External links
Florence Carlyle at ArtNet, retrieved on May 25, 2007.

1864 births
1923 deaths
Canadian women painters
People from Crowborough
Académie Julian alumni
19th-century Canadian painters
20th-century Canadian painters
19th-century Canadian women artists
20th-century Canadian women artists
Académie Delécluse alumni
Canadian Impressionist painters
Members of the Royal Canadian Academy of Arts